Central China Expeditionary Army (Nakashina hakengun) was a field army of the Imperial Japanese Army during the Second Sino-Japanese War. 

On November 7, 1937 Japanese Central China Area Army (CCAA) was organized as a reinforcement expeditionary army by combining the  Shanghai Expeditionary Army (SEF) and the IJA Tenth Army.  General Iwane Matsui was appointed as its commander-in-chief, concurrent with his assignment as commander-in-chief of the SEF.  Matsui reported directly to Imperial General Headquarters.  After the Battle of Nanjing, the CCAA was disbanded on February 14, 1938 and its component units were reassigned to the Central China Expeditionary Army.

On September 12, 1939 by Army Order 362, the China Expeditionary Army was formed with the merger of the Central China Expeditionary Army with the Northern China Area Army.

List of Commanders

Commanding officer

Chief of Staff

Japanese armies
Military units and formations established in 1937
Military units and formations disestablished in 1939
Expeditionary units and formations